Vanmeri Nadeyi Purushothaman (9 April 1909, in Mahé, Puducherry – 29 April 1990, at Pallur, Mahé) was an Indian Congress leader. He was elected as MLA several times from Mahé over a period of thirty-five years. He also had held office as deputy speaker in the Pondicherry assembly between 1964 and 1968. He has been awarded the status of freedom fighter as he fought against the French during their regime in Mahe. He was reputed to be quite well-versed in the French Language.

He was the last Mayor and the first chairman of the Mahé Municipality. He is survived by his sons K.V. Jinadas, N.K. Mithran and Sree Valsan, and two other daughters.

See Also
List of speakers of the Puducherry Legislative Assembly

References

External links
History of Mahé Municipality

1909 births
1990 deaths
People from Mahe district
Indian National Congress politicians from Puducherry
Members of the Puducherry Legislative Assembly
Puducherry politicians